Bernard Colreavy (30 June 1871 – 30 November 1946) was an Australian cricketer. He played one first-class match for New South Wales in 1899/1900.

See also
 List of New South Wales representative cricketers

References

External links
 

1871 births
1946 deaths
Australian cricketers
New South Wales cricketers
Cricketers from Sydney